Mary Webb School and Science College is a coeducational secondary school located in Pontesbury, Shropshire, England.

Founded in 1957, it was originally titled Pontesbury Secondary Modern School. In 1977, following the abolition of the tripartite system, the school became a comprehensive school. The Mary Webb School, named after the romantic poet of the same name, was designated a specialist Science College in 2003.

Previously a community school administered by Shropshire Council, in January 2019 Mary Webb School converted to academy status. The school is now sponsored by the Central Shropshire Academy Trust.

Academics
The school received a rating of "good" (overall) and "outstanding" in the area of leadership and management from Ofsted during the May 2015 inspection.

Former pupils
Mary Webb School
David Edwards, footballer, Reading F.C. and Wales

Pontesbury Secondary Modern School
Peter Wall, footballer

References

External links
Official Website

Secondary schools in Shropshire
Academies in Shropshire
Educational institutions established in 1957
1957 establishments in England